Milhac-d'Auberoche is a former railway station in Saint-Crépin-d'Auberoche, Nouvelle-Aquitaine, France. The station is located on the Coutras - Tulle railway line. The station is served by TER Nouvelle-Aquitaine bus services on demand to Saint-Pierre-de-Chignac. Train services were suspended in 2020.

References

Railway stations in France opened in 1860
Defunct railway stations in Dordogne